Albert Lexie (August 1, 1942- October 16, 2018) was a shoeshiner from Monessen, Pennsylvania, United States, who was known for his donations to charity.

Lexie worked at the Children's Hospital of Pittsburgh since the early 1980s.  As of February 2013, he had donated $200,000 over the course of his career to the Free Care Fund, more than a third of his lifetime salary.

Lexie built himself a shoeshine box while in eighth grade shop class at Monessen High School, the last year he attended school. In June 1999, he was awarded an honorary diploma from Monessen High School.

Lexie was recognized by People magazine's "All-Stars Among Us" program and was honored by People and the Major League Baseball organization at the Major League Baseball All-Star Game in Anaheim, California on July 13, 2010.

In 2006, he was inducted into the Hall of Fame for Caring Americans by the Caring Institute.

On March 12, 2012, the biography Albert's Kids: The Heroic Work of Shining Shoes for Sick Children was published by RoseDog Books and the Children's Hospital of Pittsburgh Foundation.

Lexie died on October 16, 2018 at the age of 76.

See also
Ronald Read (philanthropist)
Dale Schroeder
Richard Leroy Walters

References

Further reading
 "From The Heart", People Magazine.  September 21, 1998 Vol. 50 No. 10
 "He Keeps Going ... and Going ... and ...", Pittsburgh Magazine. June 2010.  Li, Xiaomeng.
 Courage Is Contagious: Ordinary People Doing Extraordinary Things To Change The Face Of America.  Kasich, John.  pp. 233–239.  Published October 19, 1999.
 Chasing Skinny Rabbits: What Leads You Into Emotional and Spiritual Exhaustion...and What Can Lead You Out. Trent, John. pp. 128–130.  Published May 10, 2010.

External links
 Official website 
 Biography of Albert Lexie, provided by UPMC Children's Hospital of Pittsburgh

2018 deaths
People from Monessen, Pennsylvania
Shoeshiners
1940s births
1942 births
20th-century American philanthropists